Chen Fengxiang (born September 1955) is a Chinese diplomat and political figure. He was born in Chahar Right Front Banner, Inner Mongolia. He graduated from Peking University with a degree in Russian language. From 1992 to 1994, he served in the office of the ambassador in Russia. Beginning in 2004, he became assistant to the head of the International Liaison Department of the Communist Party of China, then in 2013, he was promoted to deputy head.

References

1955 births
Living people
Chinese Communist Party politicians from Inner Mongolia
Chinese diplomats
Members of the Standing Committee of the 12th National People's Congress
Members of the Standing Committee of the 13th National People's Congress
Peking University alumni
People from Ulanqab
People's Republic of China politicians from Inner Mongolia